Sir Benedict Munro, Baron von Meikeldorf was a Scottish soldier of the English and Scottish Civil War who settled in Germany during the mid 17th century. He is believed to have been born between 1615 and 1630.

Benedict was the youngest son of Robert Munro, Commissary of Caithness, who in turn was the third son of John Mor Munro, 3rd of Coul, a descendant of George Munro, 10th Baron of Foulis.

Benedict was in the prime of his life when he fought in the royalist army at the Battle of Worcester in 1651 against the army of Oliver Cromwell. The royalists were defeated, however Benedict escaped to Germany. He grew to become Baron Benedict von Meikeldorf, lord of a petty German dukedom, the like of which once divided the country. In 1900 his descendants still held a baronial state there.

One of Benedict's older brothers William Munroe was captured at the Battle of Worcester and deported to America where he became a successful land owner.

References

Benedict
Munro, Benedict
Year of death unknown
Year of birth unknown